is a Japanese gymnast. He competed in eight events at the 1952 Summer Olympics.

References

External links
 

1927 births
Possibly living people
Japanese male artistic gymnasts
Olympic gymnasts of Japan
Gymnasts at the 1952 Summer Olympics
Sportspeople from Fukushima Prefecture
20th-century Japanese people